The 59th district of the Texas House of Representatives contains the entirety of Coryell, Erath, Hamilton, and Hood counties. The current Representative is Shelby Slawson, who was first elected in 2020.

References 

59